Georgia Fair is an Australian music duo comprising Jordan Wilson and Benjamin Riley. Their debut album, All Through Winter, was released in October 2011, which peaked in the top 100 of the ARIA Albums Chart and reached No. 1 on the related ARIA Hitseekers Albums Chart. Their second album, Trapped Flame (October 2013), also reach the ARIA top 100.

History

Wilson and Riley met in high school at the age of 13, they began playing and writing music together and would continue to do so in various incarnations, until settling on Georgia Fair shortly after they left school. The band's name is said to have come from a venue of one of their first shows mistakenly billing "Jordan and Ben" as Georgia Fair due to a bad phone connection.

In 2010 Jordan and Ben hooked up with Bill Reynolds of Band of Horses to record what would end up being their debut LP All Through Winter. Commencing tracking in Asheville, North Carolina, the pair travelled with Reynolds to Austin, Texas and then Atlanta, Georgia where the record was completed.

The pair recorded their second LP in Los Angeles with producer Ted Hutt titled "Trapped Flame" released in October 2013.

The band has since commenced work on a follow up record, working out of studio usually occupied by fellow Sydney band The Preatures. A single, "Break", and a subsequent video was released in October 2014.

Discography

Albums 

Notes

Extended plays

Singles

References

External links 

Australian folk music groups